Josef Musil (7 August 1920 – 6 January 2005) was an Austrian footballer. He played in five matches for the Austria national football team from 1947 to 1952. He was also part of Austria's squad for the football tournament at the 1948 Summer Olympics, but he did not play in any matches.

References

External links
 

1920 births
2005 deaths
Austrian footballers
Austria international footballers
Place of birth missing
Association football goalkeepers
SK Rapid Wien players